Tamar is a station on MTR's proposed North Island line (NIL) on the north shore of Hong Kong Island. It will be located on the former site of HMS Tamar on Hong Kong Island, Hong Kong. It will also act as a transfer station between the two lines.

According to a 2014 study, it was suggested to start construction of the station in 2021 and open it in 2026. Geographically, the  MTR station is located to the south, while Tamar Park is located to the north. The station would sit at the foot of the Central Government Complex, directly under Tamar Park.

History 
In 2006, the Hong Kong Government was set to implement the Tamar Development Project. The new Government Complex was inaugurated in 2011, but the timetable of the construction of the NIL station was still undecided.

On 21 February 2013, the Highways Department published an improved version of the "Railway Development Strategy." As part of the second phase of public consultation for the North Island line, the department created two proposals: a "swap" scheme and an "interchange" scheme. In the former plan, the North Island line would be split in two lines. Meanwhile, the Tseung Kwan O line would extend west past North Point station to the Island line's  station before going along the current Island line to the Kennedy Town station. In the latter, the Tung Chung line would be extended one stop, from Hong Kong to Tamar, while the Tseung Kwan O line would be extended three stops, from North Point to Causeway Bay North, Exhibition, and Tamar (with Tamar becoming an interchange station and terminal for the two lines). The Hong Kong government opted for the "interchange" scheme in 2014, which meant that the Tamar station would be a four-track, two-level station, as opposed to the two-track, one-level station proposed as part of the "swap" scheme.

References

MTR stations on Hong Kong Island
Proposed railway stations in Hong Kong
Tung Chung line
Admiralty, Hong Kong